The women's 4 × 5 kilometre relay at the 2007 Asian Winter Games was held on February 3, 2007 at Beida Lake Skiing Resort, China.

Schedule
All times are China Standard Time (UTC+08:00)

Results

References

Results FIS

External links
Results of the Fifth Winter Asian Games

Women Relay